Adam Gregory Simon (born March 13, 1977) is an American actor and screenwriter. Simon is the writer of Man Down, a post-apocalyptic thriller directed by Dito Montiel which stars Shia LaBeouf, Kate Mara, Gary Oldman, Jai Courtney and Clifton Collins, Jr.

Career 
He started his professional career as an actor in theatre with roles in the early 2000s and then made his television and film debut. In 2015 Simon wrote Synapse, a film where he made his theatrical acting debut. Synapse starred Sophina Brown, Henry Simmons, Joshua Alba and Simon himself. Synapse is the first theatrical film produced by Los Angeles Center Studios and Hollywood Locations.

In 2018 Simon partnered with filmmaker Joe Carnahan, co-writing a reimagining of the popular cult film, The Raid, originally directed by Gareth Evans. He wrote Point Blank, an action thriller for Gaumont Films and Netflix, based on the Fred Cavaye French Film, A Bout Portant. It was released on July 12, 2019.

Filmography

Film

Television

References

External links 
 

1977 births
20th-century American male actors
21st-century American male actors
Male actors from California
American male film actors
American male television actors
American male screenwriters
Screenwriters from California
Living people